A by-election for the seat of Northcote in the Victorian Legislative Assembly was held on 18 November 2017. The by-election was triggered by the death of Labor Party MP Fiona Richardson on 23 August 2017. While the seat historically has firmly been in the Labor Party's hands since its inception in 1927, environmental issues, rising house prices and demographic trends have resulted in a stronger Greens vote at recent elections. The Liberal Party elected not to field a candidate.

The seat was won by the Greens on a swing of more than 11.5%. ABC election expert Antony Green called the seat for the Greens at 8.30 pm on the night of the count. Greens candidate Lidia Thorpe became the first female Aboriginal MP in the Victorian Parliament as a result of the victory and the Greens increased their representation in the Legislative Assembly to three MPs.

Background
The by-election was called following the death of former Labor member for the district and Minister for Women, Fiona Richardson. Having taken medical leave from Parliament on 7 August 2017, she died in office on 23 August. This triggered a vacancy in the seat, with writs for election being issued by the Assembly Speaker, Colin Brooks.

Candidates
A total of 12 candidates were declared nominated by the VEC. The Liberal Party decided against fielding a candidate.

Results

|- style="background-color:#E9E9E9"
! colspan="6" style="text-align:left;" |After distribution of preferences

The VEC stops distributing preferences when a candidate reaches over 50 per cent of the vote. An indicative two-candidate-preferred count had Lidia Thorpe (Greens) on 20,137 votes (55.6%) to Clare Burns (Labor) on 16,080 votes (44.4%)—a swing of 11.6 percentage points to the Greens.

See also
List of Victorian state by-elections
2018 Batman by-election

References

External links
Victorian Electoral Commission: Northcote District by-election
ABC Elections: 2017 Northcote by-election

2017 elections in Australia
Victorian state by-elections
2010s in Victoria (Australia)
November 2017 events in Australia